Tala Marandi is an Indian politician and member of the Bharatiya Janata Party. Marandi is a member of the Jharkhand Legislative Assembly from the Borio constituency in Sahebganj district in 2005 and 2014.

References 

People from Sahibganj district
Bharatiya Janata Party politicians from Jharkhand
Members of the Jharkhand Legislative Assembly
Living people
Jharkhand MLAs 2005–2009
Jharkhand MLAs 2014–2019
Year of birth missing (living people)